The Czech Republic national under-18 football team are a feeder team for the main Czech Republic national football team.

Recent results

2018 Slovakia Cup

Players

Current squad 
 The following players were called up for the friendly tournament in Israel.
 Match dates: 25, 27 and 29 November 2022
 Opposition: ,  and 
 Caps and goals correct as of:''' 25 November 2022, after the match against

Recent call-ups

See also 
Czech Republic national football team
Czech Republic national under-21 football team
Czech Republic national under-19 football team
Czech Republic national under-17 football team

References 

under-18
European national under-18 association football teams
Youth football in the Czech Republic